Anthony Ledgard  (born 17 December 1971) is a Peruvian former cyclist. He competed in the individual pursuit at the 1992 Summer Olympics.

References

External links
 

1971 births
Living people
Peruvian male cyclists
Olympic cyclists of Peru
Cyclists at the 1992 Summer Olympics
Sportspeople from Lima
20th-century Peruvian people
21st-century Peruvian people